Leichhardt was an electoral district of the Legislative Assembly in the Australian state of New South Wales, created in 1894, with the abolition of multi-member electorates and partly replacing Balmain, and named after and including the Sydney suburb of Leichhardt. With the introduction of proportional representation, it was absorbed into the multi-member electorate of Western Suburbs. It was recreated in 1927, but was abolished in 1962.

Members for Leichhardt

Election results

References 

Former electoral districts of New South Wales
Constituencies established in 1894
1894 establishments in Australia
Constituencies disestablished in 1920
1920 disestablishments in Australia
Constituencies established in 1927
1927 establishments in Australia
Constituencies disestablished in 1962
1962 disestablishments in Australia